A sin-eater is a person in some religious traditions who ritually takes on the sins of a household.

Sin-eater may also refer to:

The Sin Eater, also known as The Order, a 2003 film
The Sin Eaters, a BBC audio book in the Torchwood franchise
Sin-Eater (comics), a Marvel Comics character
Sin Eater, or Onimar Synn, a DC Comics character
"Sin-Eaters", a track by the National about the Great Recession of 2007–2008, which appears on their 2010 single "Bloodbuzz Ohio"

See also
Geist: The Sin-Eaters, a role-playing game
The Last Sin Eater, a 1998 novel
The Last Sin Eater (film), a 2007 film based on the novel
The Incredible Journey of Doctor Meg Laurel, 1979 TV movie with a significant sin eater character 
The Sin Eater's Daughter, a young adult fantasy novel trilogy written by Melinda Salisbury